Kidderminster was a parliamentary constituency in Worcestershire, represented in the House of Commons of the Parliament of the United Kingdom. It elected one Member of Parliament (MP) by the first past the post voting system.

History
The borough of Kidderminster returned two members to Parliament in 1295, Walter Caldrigan and William Lihtfot, but not to any subsequent one. From 1295 to 1832 Kidderminster had no separate representation from Worcestershire.

The constituency was created by the Reform Act 1832 for the 1832 general election and was abolished for the 1983 general election, when it was largely replaced by the new Wyre Forest constituency.

Boundaries

1832–1868
The Reform Act 1832 enfranchised Kidderminster as a parliamentary borough. The constituency comprised the township of Kidderminster Borough and part of the township of Kidderminster Foreign. The Parliamentary Boundaries Act of the same year set out the boundaries in detail:
From the Point at or near Proud Cross at which the Boundary of the old Borough meets the Broomfield Road, along the Boundary of the old Borough, to the Point at which the Abberley Road meets the Black Brook; thence, Westward, along the Abberley Road to the first Point at which the same is met by a Hedge running due South therefrom; thence along the said Hedge to its Southern Extremity near a Stone Quarry; thence in a straight Line to the said Stone Quarry; thence in a straight Line to the First Mile Stone on the Bewdley Road; thence, Westward, along the Bewdley Road to the Point at which the same is joined by a Footpath leading to the Stourport Road; thence along the said Footpath to the Point at which the same meets the Boundary of the old Borough; thence, Southward, along the Boundary of the old Borough to the Point at which the same meets the South-eastern Fence of a Wood called "The Copse," situated on the Eastern Bank of the River Stour; thence along the said Fence to the Point at which the same meets Hoo Lane; thence across Hoo Lane, over a Stile called "Gallows Stile," along a Footpath leading from the said Stile to the Lane from Hoo Brook to Comberton Hill, to the Point at which the last-mentioned Footpath meets the Lane from Hoo-Brook to Comberton Hill; thence, Northward, along the Lane from Hoo-Brook to Comberton Hill to the Point at which the same meets the Boundary of the old Borough; thence, Northward, along the Boundary of the old Borough to the Point first described.

1868–1918
The Representation of the People Act 1867 (also known as the Second Reform Act) redrew parliamentary constituencies. The consequential Boundary Act of the following year extended the boundaries of the parliamentary borough. Three areas of the parish of Kidderminster and part of the parish of Wolverley were added.

1918–1950
The next change in constituency boundaries was carried out under the Representation of the People Act 1918. The parliamentary borough was abolished and a new Kidderminster constituency was created as a division of the parliamentary county of Worcestershire. It consisted of a wide area of northern Worcestershire, comprising the following local government districts:
The municipal borough of Kidderminster
Bromsgrove Urban District
North Bromsgrove Urban District
Redditch Urban District
Bromsgrove Rural District
Kidderminster Rural District

1950–1983
The Representation of the People Act 1948 redrew constituencies throughout Great Britain and Northern Ireland: the revised boundaries were first used at the 1950 general election. The 1948 legislation also introduced the terms "borough constituency" and "county constituency". The Bromsgrove and Redditch areas were formed into a separate Bromsgrove constituency, while the new Kidderminster County Constituency, now took much of north west Worcestershire. It was defined as follows:
The boroughs of Bewdley and Kidderminster
The urban district of Stourport on Severn
The rural districts of Kidderminster, Martley and Tenbury

The boundaries were not altered at the next redistribution in 1970 and the seat remained unchanged until the 1983 general election, when constituencies were realigned to the administrative geography introduced in 1974. A new seat of Wyre Forest was formed centred on Kidderminster.

Members of Parliament 

Note A:  Grant was granted the title of baron in the Italian nobility by Victor Emmanuel II in 1868, and styled himself "Baron Albert Grant" thereafter. His election in 1874 was overturned on petition.

Elections

Elections in the 1830s

Elections in the 1840s

Godson's death caused a by-election.

Elections in the 1850s

Lowe was appointed Vice-President of the Board of Trade, requiring a by-election.

Elections in the 1860s
Bristow resigned, causing a by-election.

Elections in the 1870s

The election was declared void on petition.

Elections in the 1880s 

Immediately following the election, upon discovering his election agent had been reported for bribery at a previous election, Brinton resigned to seek re-election at a by-election.

Elections in the 1890s

Elections in the 1900s

Elections in the 1910s 

General Election 1914–15:

Another General Election was required to take place before the end of 1915. The political parties had been making preparations for an election to take place and by the July 1914, the following candidates had been selected; 
Unionist: Eric Knight

Elections in the 1920s

Elections in the 1930s 

General Election 1939–40

Another General Election was required to take place before the end of 1940. The political parties had been making preparations for an election to take place and by the Autumn of 1939, the following candidates had been selected; 
Conservative: John Wardlaw-Milne

Elections in the 1940s

Elections in the 1950s

Elections in the 1960s

Elections in the 1970s

References

Sources 

Kidderminster
Parliamentary constituencies in Worcestershire (historic)
Constituencies of the Parliament of the United Kingdom established in 1832
Constituencies of the Parliament of the United Kingdom disestablished in 1983
Constituencies of the Parliament of the United Kingdom established in 1295